The Hamburg-Altona–Kiel railway is the oldest railway line in the German state of Schleswig-Holstein, and the first railway in Denmark or its dependencies at the time, and first to reach the Baltic Sea. Today, it connects Hamburg, Neumünster and Kiel. It is one of the first railways in Germany. When it opened in 1844, Altona and Kiel were the largest cities in the Duchy of Holstein. The line is now owned by DB Netz.

Route 

The route begins at the terminal station of Hamburg-Altona. This line runs parallel to the route of Hamburg S-Bahn lines S3 and S21.

The first stop on the main line is Pinneberg, which provides interchange with the S-Bahn. The Marsh Railway to the North Sea coast and the line to Henstedt-Ulzburg branch from Elmshorn.

Further north in Neumünster the line connects to Flensburg, to Heide and Büsum and to Bad Oldesloe. Freight and express trains to Scandinavia do not continue towards Kiel, but instead run on the continuously electrified line from Neumünster to the Danish border at Flensburg. Regional services run from Kiel to Lübeck and to Flensburg.

History

The line was built by the Altona-Kiel Railway Company (Altona-Kieler Eisenbahn-Gesellschaft, AKE). Construction commenced in 1842 and the line opened on 18 September 1844.  The company's operations were taken over by the Prussian state railways in 1884.

The opening of the Hamburg-Altona link line in 1866 made it possible for the first time for trains from Kiel to Hamburg Hauptbahnhof. However, the facilities at Kiel could not handle main line trains suitable for operations to Hamburg.  Moreover, the older residents of Holstein preferred to travel to the Holstein town of Altona, rather than the "big city" of Hamburg.

On 24 September 1995, the 109 kilometre long line was put into electric operations. The travel time between Hamburg and Kiel was shortened by up to 38 minutes. For the first time, two pairs of Intercity-Express trains served Kiel daily.

Current operations 

A variety of traffic runs along the entire length of the line, or on the section between Hamburg and Neumünster, consisting of freight traffic, ICE/IC/EC long-distance passenger services and regional passenger services. These are operated by different railway companies, including Deutsche Bahn AG and Regionalbahn Schleswig-Holstein. In addition there are DSB services from Fredericia via Neumünster to Hamburg Hauptbahnhof.

The trains used on the route are of types often used by the railway companies. The share of Regional-Express services operated with double-deck carriages was increased from 14 December 2008. All RE services are now run with double-deck carriages. ICE and IC services between Hamburg and Denmark or Kiel also stop in Neumünster.

On 4 April 2009, DB Regio took operations of the Kiel–Neumünster regional service back from Nord-Ostsee-Bahn (NOB), in exchange for the passenger services on the Kiel–Eckernförde section. DB Regio operated the service with class 648 multiple units again, which was intended to rationalise rolling stock circulation. The Regionalbahn Kiel / Neumünster service, which is run as RB 77, is operated with a class 112 or 143 electric locomotive and a five-car SHE set, consisting of a 1st class carriage, three 2nd class carriages and a control car.

The Wrist–Hamburg-Altona route has been operated as the RB 71 service since December 2014. It is operated by Nordbahn Eisenbahngesellschaft with electric FLIRT sets at hourly frequency. Wrist station received an additional reversing track.

In long-distance operations, the line between Hamburg and Kiel is served by ICE trains of the first and second generation and IC and EC services operated with an electric locomotive of classes 101 or 120 and eight to eleven cars. Between Hamburg, Neumünster and continuing to Flensburg, there are four daily Danish IC3 services each way on the Hamburg–Fredericia route (due to train path conflicts these trains not stop in Neumünster, but instead stop in Hamburg-Dammtor and Schleswig) and Intercity services operated with an electric locomotive of classes 101, 120 or 182 with seven to ten passenger cars.

References

Railway lines in Schleswig-Holstein
Railway lines in Hamburg
Hamburg S-Bahn
Railway lines opened in 1844